Tetradium ruticarpum is a tree that comes from China and Korea. It was previously classified in the genus Euodia as Euodia ruticarpa. The fruit is usually used, denoted sometimes as fructus.  It has a strong bitter taste, and is used in traditional Chinese medicine (TCM) and is a recognized herb in Kampo. Both the former genus name and the species name are often misspelled, and the plant usually appears in sources dealing with traditional Chinese medicine as "Evodia(e) rutaecarpa".

Production

Cultivation
Tetradium ruticarpum is grown mainly in China.

Harvesting
The fruit is picked.  It may be consumed as food.

Traditional medicine

Traditional Chinese medicine
In traditional Chinese medicine the herb is described as a fruit.

Kampo
Tetradium ruticarpum is called  in Japanese, used in Goshuyu-tou and Unkentou (:ja:温経湯).  These are Kampo (漢方) preparations of mixed herbs, the former named after this plant.  The mixture is noted for having a high concentration (132.6 to 706.3 mmol/100 g) of antioxidants, where the other constituents of the mixture rank lower.

Contraindications 
Allergic reactions have occasionally been reported in users of medicinal preparations of the plant.

Biochemical analysis 
There has been relatively little scientific study of Tetradium ruticarpum except for antioxidant capacity of one of its mixtures.

Notable compounds in T. ruticarpum include: 

alkaloids:
 rutecarpine, an indole alkaloid that is a COX-2 inhibitor
 0-hydroxyrutaecarpine
 evodiamine, a possible thermogenic agent and stimulant, named after the former name of the genus
 dehydroevodiamine
 synephrine, an adrenergic receptor agonist 
 1-methyl-2-n-nonyl-4(1H)quinolone
 evocarpine
 dihydroevocarpine 

flavonoids:
 isorhamnetin-7-O-rutinoside 
 diosmetin-7-O-β-d-glucopyranoside

In rats, the half-lives of most of these compounds was found to be relatively short, between 0.5 - 2 hours.

Variants
There are a few variants:
 var. officinalis
 var bodinieri (Dode) Huang

References

Zanthoxyloideae
Flora of China
Flora of Korea